Yusefabad (also Romanized as Yūsefābād; also known as Yusef Abad Hoomeh and Yūsofābād-e Ḩūmeh) is a village in Madvarat Rural District, in the Central District of Shahr-e Babak County, Kerman Province, Iran. At the 2006 census, its population was 63, in 18 families.

References 

Populated places in Shahr-e Babak County